Suresh Kumar Khanna (born 6 May 1953) is an Indian politician and a member of the 10th, 11th, 12th, 13th, 14th, 15th, 16th, 17th Legislative Assembly of Uttar Pradesh & 18th Uttar Pradesh Assembly in India. Currently he is serving as Cabinet Minister for Finance, Parliamentary affairs Departments in Yogi Adityanath ministry. He represents the Shahjahanpur constituency of Uttar Pradesh and is a member of the Bharatiya Janta Party political party. He has won 9 times MLA election consecutively in his constituency.

Early life and education
Khanna was born 6 May 1953 in Shahjahanpur district, in a Hindu Khatri family to his father Ram Narayan Khanna. He attended the University of Lucknow.

Political career

Suresh Kumar Khanna has been an MLA for nine straight terms, a record for UP Assembly. He has represented the Shahjahanpur constituency during all his terms and is a member of the Bharatiya Janata Party political party.

On 19 March 2017, he was appointed Cabinet Minister for Urban Development and Parliamentary Affairs in Yogi Adityanath ministry.

On 21 August 2019, after first cabinet expansion of Yogi Adityanath his ministry department changed as Minister of Finance, Parliamentary affairs and Medical Education Departments.

Posts held

See also

 Shahjahanpur (Assembly constituency)
 Sixteenth Legislative Assembly of Uttar Pradesh
 Uttar Pradesh Legislative Assembly

References 

1953 births
Bharatiya Janata Party politicians from Uttar Pradesh
Living people
People from Shahjahanpur district
Uttar Pradesh MLAs 1989–1991
Uttar Pradesh MLAs 1991–1993
Uttar Pradesh MLAs 1993–1996
Uttar Pradesh MLAs 1997–2002
Uttar Pradesh MLAs 2002–2007
Uttar Pradesh MLAs 2007–2012
Uttar Pradesh MLAs 2012–2017
Uttar Pradesh MLAs 2017–2022
State cabinet ministers of Uttar Pradesh
Yogi ministry
Uttar Pradesh MLAs 2022–2027